The Puebla Mexico Temple is a temple of the Church of Jesus Christ of Latter-day Saints under construction in Puebla, Mexico.

History 
The intent to construct the temple was announced by church president Russell M. Nelson on October 7, 2018. The Puebla Mexico Temple was announced concurrently with 11 other temples. At the time, the number of operating or announced temples was 201.

On November 30, 2019, a groundbreaking to signify beginning of construction was held, with Arnulfo Valenzuela, who was then president of the church's Mexico Area, presiding.

See also 

 The Church of Jesus Christ of Latter-day Saints in Mexico
 Comparison of temples of The Church of Jesus Christ of Latter-day Saints
 List of temples of The Church of Jesus Christ of Latter-day Saints
 List of temples of The Church of Jesus Christ of Latter-day Saints by geographic region
 Temple architecture (Latter-day Saints)

References

External links 
 Church Newsroom of The Church of Jesus Christ of Latter-day Saints
 Puebla Mexico Temple at ChurchofJesusChristTemples.org

Temples (LDS Church) in Mexico
Proposed religious buildings and structures of the Church of Jesus Christ of Latter-day Saints
The Church of Jesus Christ of Latter-day Saints in Mexico
21st-century Latter Day Saint temples
Proposed buildings and structures in Mexico